The Melsom Prize is a Norwegian literary award. It is given annually to a writer or translator who writes in Nynorsk, for a work published during the preceding year. The prize was established in 1922 by the shipowner Ferdinand Melsom. The prize sum was 40,000 Norwegian kroner in 2015.

Recipients
The following have received the prize:

References

Awards established in 1922
Norwegian literary awards
Nynorsk